Fresh One Productions is a television production company set up by Jamie Oliver in 2001

Notable series include:
 Jamie's Kitchen First production, in 2001
 Jamie's School Dinners (won award for 'Best Factual Series or Strand' at the British Academy Television Awards 2006)
 Jamie at Home
 Jamie Oliver's Food Revolution (won award for 'Outstanding Reality Program' at the Primetime Emmys in 2010)
 Jamie's Dream School
 Jamie's 15-Minute Meals a 40 episode series which aired in 2012
Two Greedy Italians -2012

British companies established in 2001
Mass media companies established in 2001
Television and film post-production companies